

Births and deaths

Deaths
Roy Williamson (1936–1990)
 Hamish Imlach (1940–1996)

Recordings
 1991 "Delirium" (Capercaillie)
 1992 "The Chase" (Wolfstone)
 1994 "The Day Dawn" (The Boys of the Lough)
 1994 "Hit the Highway" (The Proclaimers)
 1995 "John McCusker" (John McCusker)
 1996 "Long Distance" (Runrig)
 1996 "Sail On" (Dick Gaughan)
 1997 "Bothy Culture" (Martyn Bennett)
 1998 "Rain Hail or Shine" (Battlefield Band)
 1999 "Redwood Cathedral" (Dick Gaughan)

Scottish music
1990s in British music
Music